Novo Selo is a village in the municipality of Kičevo, North Macedonia. It used to be part of the former municipality of Oslomej.

Demographics
As of the 2021 census, Novo Selo had 38 residents with the following ethnic composition:
Albanians 36
Macedonians 1
Persons for whom data are taken from administrative sources 1

According to the 2002 census, the village had a total of 143 inhabitants. Ethnic groups in the village include:
Albanians 141
Macedonians 2

References

External links

Villages in Kičevo Municipality
Albanian communities in North Macedonia